The Mini-Affair is a 1967 British romantic comedy film directed by Robert Amram, and starring Georgie Fame, Rosemary Nicols and John Clive. Music is provided by the Bee Gees.

Plot summary
A leading pop star is kidnapped in swinging London.

Cast

 Georgie Fame as Georgie Hart
 Rosemary Nicols as Charlotte
 John Clive as Joe
 Bernard Archard as Sir Basil Grinling
 Lucille Soong as Lucille
 Rick Dane as Mike Maroon
 Julian Curry as Ronnie
 Gretchen Regan as Marianne
 Madeline Smith as Samantha
 Clement Freud as Stephen Catchpole
 Totti Truman Taylor as Aunt Grace
 Clive Dunn as Tyson
 Roy Kinnear as Fire Extinguisher Salesman
 Eric Pohlmann as World Banker
 William Rushton as Chancellor of the Exchequer
 Irene Handl as Cook in Chinese Restaurant
 Guy Middleton as Colonel Highwater
 Ben Aris as TV Producer
 Milton Reid as Fisherman

References

External links

1967 films
1967 romantic comedy films
British romantic comedy films
Films set in London
1960s English-language films
1960s British films